USS Eridanus (AK-92) was a  commissioned by the US Navy for service in World War II and manned by a US Coast Guard crew. She was named after the constellation Eridanus. She was responsible for delivering goods and equipment to locations in the war zone.

Construction
Eridanus was launched 9 April 1943, as Luther Burbank, MCE hull 1099, by Permanente Metals Corporation, Yard No. 2, Richmond, California, under a Maritime Commission (MARCOM) contract; sponsored by Mrs. Luther Burbank; acquired by the Navy 22 April 1943; and commissioned 8 May 1943.

Service history
Eridanus carried cargo and passengers between US West Coast ports and bases in the southwest Pacific, the Hawaiians, New Zealand, the Philippines, and the Palaus from 26 June 1943 to 3 February 1946, often making lengthy tows in addition to her cargo operations. Almost constantly at sea, she played her part in the Navy's gigantic task of carrying supplies for its ships and shore bases, as well as for the US Marines and US Army, halfway round the world at the same time as it carried on combat operations. In February 1944 she made a direct contribution to the troops seizing islands in the northern Solomons, bringing cargo and passengers to Bougainville.
 
Her last service was a long and difficult towing job, in which she took section of a floating dry dock from Eniwetok, sailing 4 February 1946, to Hampton Roads, Virginia, arriving 16 April.

Decommissioning
She was decommissioned at Baltimore, Maryland, 8 May 1946, and returned to the War Shipping Administration (WSA), 15 May 1946, her name reverted to Luther Burbank. She was then laid up in the National Defense Reserve Fleet, James River Group, Lee Hall, Virginia, the same day.

Merchant service
On 14 February 1947, she was sold for commercial service to John P. G. Livanos, Athens, Greece, for $544,546. She was re-flagged for Greece and renamed Panagiotis.

On 15 November 1955, she ran aground at Kunsan, Korea while carrying a load of coal from Baltimore, Maryland, to Inchon. She broke in two, 21 November 1955, and was declared a total loss. Far Eastern Marine Transport Co Ltd, Inchon, bought her 18 September 1956. Both parts were refloated, towed to Pusan, then to Shimonoseki, Japan. The aft section arrived 18 September 1956, with the name Silla. The forepart arrived three days later, 21 September 1956. She resumed service as Silla, flagged South Korean. She was laid up 31 January 1972, at Masan, South Korea. She was finally sold to local breakers, where she resumed trading for short period before being eventually being scrapped at Masan, September 1972.

Awards
Eridanus received one battle star for World War II service. Her crew was eligible for the following medals:
 American Campaign Medal
 Asiatic-Pacific Campaign Medal (1)
 World War II Victory Medal (with Asia clasp)

References

Bibliography

External links

Crater-class cargo ships
World War II auxiliary ships of the United States
Ships built in Richmond, California
1943 ships
James River Reserve Fleet